Benson Wood (March 31, 1839 – August 27, 1915) was a U.S. Representative from Illinois.

Early life and military service
Born near Bridgewater, Pennsylvania, Wood attended the common schools, Montrose (Pennsylvania) Academy, and Wyoming (Pennsylvania) Seminary.  He moved to Illinois in 1859 and for two years was principal of a village school in Lee County.  During the Civil War, he enlisted as first lieutenant of Company C, thirty-fourth Regiment, Illinois Volunteer Infantry, September 7, 1861.  He was promoted to captain May 1, 1862.  He was honorably discharged on January 29, 1863.

Legal career and entry into politics
Wood graduated from the Union College of Law in 1864.  He was admitted to the bar in 1864 and engaged in the practice of law in Effingham, Illinois.  He served as member of the Illinois House of Representatives in 1872, and was a delegate to the Republican National Convention in 1876 and 1888.  He served as mayor of Effingham, Illinois 1881-1883.

Congressional career
Wood was elected as a Republican to the Fifty-fourth Congress (March 4, 1895 – March 3, 1897).  He was an unsuccessful candidate for reelection in 1896 to the Fifty-fifth Congress.  He resumed the practice of law in Effingham, Illinois.  He served as president of the Effingham State Bank 1903-1912, and chairman of the board of directors 1912-1915.  He died in Effingham on August 27, 1915.  He was interred in Oakridge Cemetery.

References
 Retrieved on 2009-03-26

1839 births
1915 deaths
Illinois lawyers
University of Chicago Law School alumni
Republican Party members of the Illinois House of Representatives
People from Beaver County, Pennsylvania
People of Illinois in the American Civil War
Union Army officers
Republican Party members of the United States House of Representatives from Illinois
19th-century American politicians
People from Effingham, Illinois
Mayors of places in Illinois
19th-century American lawyers
Military personnel from Pennsylvania